"I Love Her" is a 2009 song by Marques Houston.

I Love Her may also refer to:
 I Love Her (film), a 2013 Ukrainian short film
 I Love Her (album) or Aku Cinta Dia, a 1985 album by Chrisye
 "I Love Her", a 1972 song by Frijid Pink

See also
 And I Love Her, a 1964 song written and recorded by the Beatles